is the name of various Buddhist temples throughout Japan China and Taiwan.
Hokke-ji, located in Nara, Nara Prefecture
Hokke-ji, located in Gifu, Gifu Prefecture
Hokke-ji, located in Miharu, Fukushima Prefecture
Fahua-si, located in Dongcheng, Beijing, China.
Fahua-si, located in Wanhua, Taipei, Taiwan.

See also
Hōkai-ji, a temple in Kamakura